In Belgium, a Royal Decree (RD) or Royal Order (Dutch), Arrêté Royal (French), or Königlicher Erlass (German) is a federal governmental decree exercising legislation, or powers the legislature has delegated to the King as secondary legislation. 

Under the Constitution of Belgium, the King cannot act alone. While the monarch is vested with executive power, he is required to exercise it through his ministers. Hence, while Royal Orders are issued with the King's signature, they must be countersigned by a minister to be valid. In turn, the countersigning minister assumes political responsibility for the order. Its implementation usually begins on the date that it is published in the Belgian Official Journal.

See also
 Primary and secondary legislation
 Order in Council

References

Belgian legislation